Þórunn Alfreðsdóttir (born 21 December 1960) is an Icelandic former butterfly swimmer. She competed in two events at the 1976 Summer Olympics.

References

External links
 

1960 births
Living people
Þórunn Alfreðsdóttir
Þórunn Alfreðsdóttir
Swimmers at the 1976 Summer Olympics
Place of birth missing (living people)